Neil S. Wheelwright (born August 20, 1932) is a former American football coach.  He served as the head football coach at Colgate University from 1968 to 1975 and at the College of the Holy Cross form 1976 to 1980, compiling a career college football coaching record of 61–72–2.

Head coaching record

References

1932 births
Living people
American football linebackers
Colgate Raiders football coaches
Hofstra Pride football coaches
Holy Cross Crusaders football coaches
Springfield Pride football players
People from Danvers, Massachusetts